Standard database management analysis

History

Maximized Tables in ERD

Flexible for all business sizes

Easy to Maintain

Waterfall and SDLC mixed

Billion Ideas when business update or report changes

Understanding Clearly about Business Flow

Maximize Cost in Future development

No Stress in SDMA

Happy with all projects

Going Faster and Stable

Understanding about Server part and Configuration for HA, Failed Over Cluster on Data Center

Strong Security and Maintenance

References

Databases